Karolcia is a 1959 novel for children by Maria Krüger. In Poland it is required reading for classes I to III (7 to 9 year olds).

Plot
The protagonist, Karolcia is an eight-year-old girl who finds a magical blue bead that fulfills her every wish. The girl and her friend Peter uses the bead to bring happiness to other people. They have various adventures including helping the President escape from an evil witch, Filomena, who also tries unsuccessfully to steal the bead. The bead becomes paler throughout the book and tells Karolcia that it will eventually vanish.  Although Karolcia is unhappy by this, she and Peter decide not to be selfish with their final wish but to wish that the dreams of others be fulfilled leading to amongst other things, children receiving new toys, and recovering in hospital.  The book ends with Karolcia being happy by this but also sad over the loss of the bead that has now disappeared.

Sequels
The success of novels for young readers encouraged the author to write a sequel. In 1970, she created a novel Witaj, Karolciu („Hello, Karolcia”) the fate of the heroes of the first part. In 2009, another author Krzysztof Zięcik wrote the rest of the adventure Karolcia na wakacjach („Karolcia on vacation”).

Books and Karolcia Welcome Karolciu are also available as an audio book in the interpretation of Maria Seweryn.

Reception
In the British IBBY newsletter IBBYLink, Maria Ostasz, while discussing Polish children's novels during the 1960s, wrote "Very popular among young female readers at the time were Maria Krüger’s Karolcia [Caroline] (1959), ..." and noted "The protagonists of these novels do not live through any great conflicts but experience the joy of being together among their peers, family and friends."

Adaptations
In 1995 the book was made into a TV movie of the same name.  In 2001 filming of another movie commenced. The director was to be Jowita Gondek. By 2008 about 80% of the film had been made but it was never completed.

References 

1959 novels
Polish novels
Novels by Maria Krüger
Polish children's novels
1959 in Poland
1959 children's books